"A Bitter Heritage" was an American television film broadcast on April 17, 1958, and again on August 7, 1958 as part of the second season of the CBS television series Playhouse 90. Joseph Landon wrote the teleplay and Paul Wendkos directed. Elizabeth Montgomery, James Drury, and Franchot Tone.

Plot
Following the death of Jesse James, his peace-loving, law-abiding son, Jesse Jr., and his uncle Frank return to the family's home town, hoping to live peaceably and raise horses. The daughter of a town leader, Mary Brecker, is attracted to Jesse Jr. They are ambushed by Tom Barnes, whose father was killed by Jesse Sr. They are also framed for a bank robbery and chased by a posse.

Cast
The following performers received screen credit for their performances:

 Elizabeth Montgomery - Mary Brecker
 James Drury - Jesse James Jr.
 Franchot Tone - Frank James
 Robert Middleton - Luke Crocker
 Henry Hull - Old Henry
 Eva LaGalliene - Grandma James
 Dayton Lummis - Colonel Brecker
 Strother Martin - Earle Wheeler
 Denver Pyle - Sam Wheeler
 Russell Thorson - Sheriff Piets

Production
The film was a Screen Gems production with Winston O'Keefe as the producer. Paul Wendkos directed, and Joseph Landon wrote the script. It was broadcast on Thursday, August 7, 1958, as part of the CBS television series Playhouse 90.

The production starred Elizabeth Montgomery as Mary Brecker, James Drury as Jesse Jr., and Franchot Tone as Frank James. Montgomery (later famous for her work on the television series Bewitched) auditioned for the role without the knowledge of her father, actor Robert Montgomery. Montgomery noted at the time, "Contrary to the old saw about 'knowing somebody', I've found that being the daughter of a famous father can be a hindrance sometimes, too."

Ethel Barrymore had signed to play Grandma James, but she broke her arm and was replaced by Eva LaGalliene.

Reception

References

1958 television plays
1958 American television episodes
Playhouse 90 (season 2) episodes